Asian News International (ANI) is an Indian news agency that offers syndicated multimedia news feed to news-bureaus in India and elsewhere. The news agency has been criticized for having served as a propaganda tool for the incumbent central government, distributing materials from a vast network of fake news websites, and misreporting events.

History

Establishment and early years (1971–2000) 
Prem had started his career in the field of photography before being employed by Visnews (and Reuters) as a photojournalist, where he went on to cover some of the most significant historical events in post-independence India. A significant figure in the domain of news and documentary film-making in the 1970s, he commanded considerable respect among foreign journalists and film-makers, and were conferred with the MBE.

In 1971, Prem established ANI (initially TVNF, India's first television news feature agency) which gained extraordinary influence within the Congress Government. TVNF played a key role in fulfilling Indira Gandhi's wishes of showcasing a positive image of India, having produced numerous films for Doordarshan, and went on to gain a monopoly in the sector.

Smita Prakash, an alumna of Indian Institute of Mass Communication, joined ANI in around 1986 as an intern and was later inducted as a full-time employee. Daughter of Inna Ramamohan Rao, former director of the Ministry of Information and Broadcasting, she married Prem's son Sanjiv in 1988 which furthered ANI's access within the government. In 1993, Reuters purchased a stake in ANI, and it was allowed to exert a complete monopoly over their India feed.

Later years (2000–present) 
By 2000, India had seen a boom of private 24x7 news channels; however, unsustainable revenue models meant that they did not have the capacity to hire video-reporters across the country. This provided scope for massive expansion of ANI's domestic video-production capacities at the behest of Sanjiv, who had a meteoric rise through the ranks (along with Smita) courtesy his shrewd managerial instincts. Asian Films TV was incorporated in 2000 to provide feed for newspapers and periodicals. The Caravan though notes that most of its foot-soldiers were low-cost recruits, who had little to do with journalism.

In 2000, the NDA government launched a Kashmir-based regional channel—DD Kashir, and ANI was allowed to produce its programs. By the end of 2005, ANI's business-model was faring impressively on a consistent basis and it shifted its office out of Gole Market, to a new five-storey building in R.K. Puram. ANI continued to be trusted by the upcoming UPA governments, to the extent of MEA choosing Smita to be a part of the two-member-strong contingent of Indian journalists at both of the joint press conferences between the incumbent prime ministers of India and USA.

In later 2000s, increasing charges of ANI feed and low quality of journalism coupled with the introduction of broadcast vans led to several national and regional channels unsubscribing them. The launch of UNI TV in 2010 by Yashwant Deshmukh gave stiff competition as well. However, Ishan Prakash, Smita's son who joined the company in 2011, procured multiple units of LiveU, expanded ANI's overseas bureaus and enlisted into contracts with multiple state governments and multiple union ministries. A monopoly was again re-created and most of its competitors shut down, eventually.

By late 2011, ANI accounted for about 99% of the Reuters feed and in FY 2017–18, they were paid ₹ 2.54 crore for the services. Archive videos were sold at rates as high as ₹ 1000 per second; in FY 2017–18, the firm reported revenues of ₹ 68.23 crore and a net profit of ₹ 9.91 crore.

Controversies

Propaganda 
Long-form reports by The Caravan and The Ken, along with reports by other media watchdogs have detailed of the agency having served as a propaganda tool of the incumbent union government.

The Caravan notes that for decades under Congress rule, ANI effectively served as the external publicity division of Ministry of External Affairs, showing the Army in a positive light and suppressing news about any internal discontent; the private nature of the organisation and the repute of its founder gave an air of non-partisan legitimacy to their videos. During the peak-spans of militancy in the Kashmir conflict, ANI was the near-sole purveyor of video-footage, esp. with Rao having been recruited as the media advisor to the state. ANI grew even closer to the government after Bharatiya Janata Party was elected to power in 2014; effects have ranged from sympathetic covering of the political campaigns by BJP to reporters being highly confrontational, when dealing with politicians from opposition parties. Smita has been widely accused of conducting favorable interviews for BJP.

In 2020, an investigation by EU DisinfoLab concluded that ANI had on multiple occasions published mostly anti-Pakistan and sometimes anti-China opinion pieces and news content, including opinion pieces falsely attributed to European politicians and other instances of disinformation, and that this material was known to have been sourced from a vast network of pro-India fake news websites run by a certain "Srivasta Group". The report noted that mainstream Indian news media regularly relies on content provided by ANI, and that ANI had on several occasions provided legitimacy and coverage to the entire "influence operation" run by the fake news network, which relied "more on ANI than on any other distribution channel" [to give it] "both credibility and a wide reach to its content". A primary aim of this fake news coverage was to "discredit Pakistan" in international forums. ANI is also believed to have played significant roles as allies of the Research and Analysis Wing, India's external intelligence agency; many of its videos depicted protests by fringe lobby groups and activists, on the aspects of human rights abuse in Pakistan.

Misinformation 
ANI has been also accused of misreporting events, by fact checkers certified by the Poynter Institute's International Fact-Checking Network (IFCN). The Caravan came across several video footages from ANI, wherein logos of random television channels from Pakistan along with Urdu tickers were superimposed on news showcasing India in a positive light; their video editors have admitted to forging clips.

Employee management 
Under a new management, ANI has been accused of practicing an aggressive model of journalism focused at maximum revenue output, where journalists were easily dispensable with. Multiple employees have accused ANI of not having any human resource management system and ill-treating their ex-employees.

See also
Press Trust of India, another news agency based in India
United News of India, multilingual news agency in India

References

External links 
 

Multilingual news services
News agencies based in India
Indian companies established in 1971
Companies based in New Delhi